D'Estienne d'Orves (F781) is the lead ship of the  in the French Navy. She was transferred to the Turkish Navy as TCG Beykoz (F-503).

Design 

Armed by a crew of 90 sailors, these vessels have the reputation of being among the most difficult in bad weather. Their high windage makes them particularly sensitive to pitch and roll as soon as the sea is formed.

Their armament, consequent for a vessel of this tonnage, allows them to manage a large spectrum of missions. During the Cold War, they were primarily used to patrol the continental shelf of the Atlantic Ocean in search of Soviet Navy submarines. Due to the poor performance of the hull sonar, as soon as an echo appeared, the reinforcement of an ASM frigate was necessary to chase it using its towed variable depth sonar.

Their role as patrollers now consists mainly of patrols and assistance missions, as well as participation in UN missions (blockades, flag checks) or similar marine policing tasks (fight against drugs, extraction of nationals, fisheries control, etc.). The mer-mer 38 or mer-mer 40 missiles have been landed, but they carry several machine guns and machine guns, more suited to their new missions.

Its construction cost was estimated at 270,000,000 French francs.

Construction and career

Service in the French Navy 
D'Estienne d'Orves was laid down on 1 September 1972 at Arsenal de Lorient, Lorient. Launched on 1 June 1973 and commissioned on 10 September 1976.

Service in the Turkish Naval Forces 
The ship was purchased from France in 2002 and acquired after arriving in Turkey on 26 June 2002 after salvage work was carried out at DCN. She was later commissioned in the same year.

Citations 

Ships built in Lorient
1973 ships
D'Estienne d'Orves-class avisos
Ships transferred from the French Navy to the Turkish Navy
Burak-class corvettes of the Turkish Navy